Lebanon competed at the 2014 Winter Olympics in Sochi, Russia from 7 to 23 February 2014. Lebanon's team consisted of two athletes in one sport, alpine skiing.

The participation of Jackie Chamoun became controversial in Lebanon after it was revealed at home in 2014 that she had posed in sexy photos for an Austrian calendar in 2011. A ministerial investigation has been mooted, while an online support protest "Strip for Jackie" has been organized. Chamoun has denied that she posed nude publicly on her Facebook page, saying that the behind the scenes images were not for publication.

Competitors

Alpine skiing 

According to the final quota allocation released on January 20, 2014, Lebanon had two athletes in qualification position.

References

External links 
Lebanon at the 2014 Winter Olympics

Nations at the 2014 Winter Olympics
2014
2014 in Lebanese sport